Veru Frank (born 12 April 1995) is a Papua New Guinean cricketer. She played for the Papua New Guinea women's national cricket team in the 2017 Women's Cricket World Cup Qualifier in February 2017.

In June 2018, she was named in Papua New Guinea's squad for the 2018 ICC Women's World Twenty20 Qualifier tournament. She made her Women's Twenty20 International (WT20I) for Papua New Guinea against Bangladesh in the World Twenty20 Qualifier on 7 July 2018.

In November 2018, she was named in the Women's Global Development Squad, to play fixtures against Women's Big Bash League (WBBL) clubs. In August 2019, she was named in Papua New Guinea's squad for the 2019 ICC Women's World Twenty20 Qualifier tournament in Scotland.

References

External links
 

1995 births
Living people
Papua New Guinean women cricketers
Papua New Guinea women Twenty20 International cricketers
Place of birth missing (living people)